The Lesser Antilles are a group of islands in the Caribbean Sea. Most of them are part of a long, partially volcanic island arc between the Greater Antilles to the north-west and the continent of South America. The islands of the Lesser Antilles form the eastern boundary of the Caribbean Sea where it meets the Atlantic Ocean. Together, the Lesser Antilles and the Greater Antilles make up the Antilles. (Somewhat confusingly, the word Caribbean is sometimes used to refer only to the Antilles, and sometimes used to refer to a much larger region.) The Lesser and Greater Antilles, together with the Lucayan Archipelago, are collectively known as the West Indies.

History after European arrival 
The Spanish were the first Europeans to arrive on the islands with the arrival of Christopher Columbus. In 1493, on his second voyage, Columbus reached the coast of the Caribbean Sea, where he sailed to discover several islands of the Lesser Antilles archipelago. He called the first island he discovered on this trip the Deseada. The Spanish claimed the island of Dominica and took solemn possession on the land of the island they called Marigalante. They then anchored next to the island they called Guadeloupe. Later they visited Montserrat, Antigua and San Cristobal. They then crossed the archipelago of the Eleven Thousand Virgins.

Over the next centuries, the Spanish, French, Dutch, Danish and English fought over several of the islands.

Pierre Belain d'Esnambuc was a French merchant and adventurer in the Caribbean, who established the first permanent French colony, Saint-Pierre, on the island of Martinique in 1635. Belain sailed to the Caribbean in 1625, hoping to establish a French settlement on the island of St Christopher (St Kitts). In 1626 the French under Pierre Belain d'Esnambuc began to take an interest in Guadeloupe, driving out the Spanish colonists.

Martinique was mapped by Columbus in 1493, but Spain had little interest in the territory. Christopher Columbus landed on 15 June 1502 after 21 days of crossing with trade winds, his fastest oceanic journey. On 15 September 1635, Pierre Belain d'Esnambuc, the French governor of the island of San Cristóbal, landed in the port of San Pedro with 80–150 French settlers after being expelled from San Cristóbal by the English. D'Esnambuc claimed Martinique for the French King Louis XIII and the "Compagnie des Îles de l'Amérique". 

Margarita Island in present-day Venezuela was discovered on 15 August 1498 during Columbus' third voyage. On that trip the Admiral would also discover the mainland, Venezuela. On that August day, Columbus spotted three islands, two of them small, low and arid (the present day Coche and Cubagua),

The province of Trinidad was created in the 16th century by the Spanish, and its capital was San José de Oruña. But during the Napoleonic Wars, in February 1797, a British force began occupying the territory. And in 1802 Spain recognized the British sovereignty.

In 1917 the United States bought the Danish Virgin Islands. Most of the British colonies became independent states, the islands of the Lesser Antilles belonging to Venezuela were divided into 2 different entities the State of Nueva Esparta and the Federal Dependencies (1938). In 1986 Aruba seceded from the Netherlands Antilles, officially becoming a country of the Kingdom of the Netherlands. In 2010 the rest of the Netherlands Antilles was dissolved to form smaller entities.

On July 18, 1995, the previously dormant Soufrière Hills volcano on the southern part of the island of Montserrat became active. The eruptions destroyed the Georgian-era capital of Montserrat, Plymouth. Between 1995 and 2000, two-thirds of the island's population was forced to flee, mainly to the UK, leaving less than 1200 people on the island in 1997 (rising to almost 5000 by 2016).

The two official French overseas departments are Guadeloupe and Martinique. St. Martin and St. Barthélemy, formerly part of the department of Guadeloupe, have had a separate status as overseas entities since 2007.

Geography 

The islands of the Lesser Antilles are divided into three groups: the Windward Islands in the south, the Leeward Islands in the north, and the Leeward Antilles in the west.

The Windward Islands are so called because they were more windward to sailing ships arriving in the New World than the Leeward Islands, given that the prevailing trade winds blow east to west. The trans-Atlantic currents and winds that provided the fastest route across the ocean brought these ships to the rough dividing line between the Windward and Leeward Islands.

The Leeward Antilles consist of the Dutch ABC islands just off the coast of Venezuela, plus a group of Venezuelan islands.

Geological formation 
The Lesser Antilles more or less coincide with the outer cliff of the Caribbean Plate. Many of the islands were formed as a result of the subduction of oceanic crust of the Atlantic Plate under the Caribbean Plate in the Lesser Antilles subduction zone. This process is ongoing and is responsible not only for many of the islands, but also for volcanic and earthquake activity in the region. The islands along the South American coast are largely the result of the interaction of the South American Plate and the Caribbean Plate which is mainly strike-slip, but includes a component of compression.

Geologically, the Lesser Antilles island arc stretches from Grenada in the south to Anguilla in the north. The Virgin Islands and Sombrero Island are geologically part of the Greater Antilles, while Trinidad is part of South America and Tobago is the remainder of a separate island arc. The Leeward Antilles are also a separate island arc, which is accreting to South America.

Political divisions 

The Lesser Antilles are divided into eight independent nations and numerous dependent and non-sovereign states (which are politically associated with the United Kingdom, France, the Netherlands, and the United States). Over one third of the total area and population of the Lesser Antilles lies within Trinidad and Tobago, a sovereign nation comprising the two southernmost islands of the Windward Island chain.

Sovereign states

Non-sovereign states and territories 

Several islands off the north coast of Venezuela and politically part of that country are also considered part of the Lesser Antilles. These are listed in the section below.

Islands 
The main Lesser Antilles are (from north to south to west):

Leeward Islands 

 Anguilla (UK)
 Saint Martin (Fr.) / Sint Maarten (Neth.)
 Saint Barthélemy (Fr.)
 Saba (Neth.)
 Sint Eustatius (Neth.)
 Saint Kitts (St. Kitts and Nevis)
 Nevis (St. Kitts and Nevis)
 Barbuda (Antigua and Barbuda)
 Antigua (Antigua and Barbuda)
Redonda (Antigua and Barbuda) uninhabited
 Montserrat (UK)
 Basse-Terre and Grande-Terre (often combined as Guadeloupe) (Fr.)
La Désirade (Guadeloupe dependency) (Fr.)
Marie-Galante (Guadeloupe dependency) (Fr.)
Îles des Saintes archipelago (Guadeloupe dependency) (Fr.)

Windward Islands 

 Dominica (Commonwealth)
 Martinique (Fr.)
 Saint Lucia (St. Lucia)
 Saint Vincent (St. Vincent and the Grenadines)
 Grenadines (St. Vincent and the Grenadines)
 Carriacou and Petite Martinique (Grenada)
 Grenada (Grenada)

Leeward Antilles 

Islands north of the Venezuelan coast (from west to east):

 Aruba (Neth.)
 Curaçao (Neth.)
 Bonaire (Neth.)
 Federal Dependencies of Venezuela (Ven)
Los Monjes Archipelago 
La Tortuga Island 
La Sola Island 
Los Testigos Islands
Los Frailes Islands 
Patos Island 
Los Roques Archipelago 
La Blanquilla Island 
Los Hermanos Archipelago 
La Orchila Island
Las Aves Archipelago 
Aves Island 
Nueva Esparta (Ven)
Margarita Island
Coche
Cubagua

Isolated islands in the Lesser Antilles 
 Barbados†
 Trinidad and Tobago†
† Physiographically, these are continental islands not part of the volcanic Windward Islands arc. However, based on proximity, these islands are sometimes grouped with the Windward Islands culturally and politically.

See also 
 Lesser Antilles Volcanic Arc
 Greater Antilles
 Lucayan Archipelago
 Organisation of Eastern Caribbean States

References

Bibliography 
 Rogonzinski, Jan. A Brief History of the Caribbean. New York: Facts on File, 1992.

External links 
 
 
 The Lesser Antilles Island Arc: Structure And Geogynamic Evolution

 
Archipelagoes of the Caribbean Sea
West Indies
Volcanic islands

mr:अँटिल्स#लेसर अँटिल्स